The Cuban twig anole (Anolis angusticeps) is an arboreal lizard found in Cuba.

References

Anoles
Reptiles of Cuba
Endemic fauna of Cuba
Reptiles described in 1856
Taxa named by Edward Hallowell (herpetologist)